Brickner may refer to :

 Balfour Brickner (November 18, 1926 – August 29, 2005), leading rabbi in the Reform Judaism movement
 Barnett R. Brickner (September 14, 1892 – May 14, 1958), American rabbi
 David Brickner (born September 29, 1958), Christian who has been head of the missionary group Jews for Jesus since 1996
 George H. Brickner (January 21, 1834 – August 12, 1904), German-born American Democratic politician
 Gordon Douglas Brickner (December 15, 1907 – September 29, 1993), American actor and director
 Linda Day (born August 12, 1938 as Linda Brickner; died October 23, 2009), American TV director
 Ralph (Harold) Brickner (May 2, 1925 – May 9, 1994), relief pitcher for 1952 Boston Red Sox

See also 
 Bruckner (disambiguation)

German-language surnames
Jewish surnames

de:Brickner
zh-min-nan:Brickner